Dietrich Schmidt may refer to:

 Dietrich Schmidt (luger), West German luger
 Dietrich Schmidt (pilot) (1919–2002), German Luftwaffe night fighter ace